Jason J. Raterink (born August 4, 1981) is an American football coach and former quarterback, who is the current Quarterbacks Coach at the University of Northern Colorado. He played college football at Wyoming. He went undrafted during the 2005 NFL Draft.

Raterink attended Skyline High School in Longmont, Colorado, where he participated in baseball, basketball and football. Raterink was a captain in football, basketball and baseball. He graduated with a 4.0 GPA and was a Co-Valedictorian of his class. Raterink was named the Class 4A Academic Athlete of the Year for the state of Colorado during his senior season. After his senior season, he moved on to the University of Wyoming where he redshirted in 2000.

Early life
Born the son of Ginger and George Raterink, J.J. attended Skyline High School in Longmont, Colorado.

College career
After high school, Raterink attended the University of Wyoming, where he was awarded a football scholarship. After taking a redshirt year in 2000, Raterink played very sparingly throughout his first three seasons of eligibility. He served mostly as the team's holder, while backing up brothers Casey and Corey Bramlet. Raterink saw more playing time as a senior. He was selected as the Co-Mountain West Player of the Week during his four touchdown performance in a triple overtime victory over UNLV which also made the Cowboys Bowl eligible for the first time in 11 years. In the 2004 Las Vegas Bowl against UCLA, Raterink caught a 22-yard touchdown on a reverse pass that helped the Cowboys upset the heavily favored Bruins 24–21. He graduated summa cum laude in the spring of 2005 with a perfect 4.0 GPA and was a finalist to be selected as a Rhodes Scholar.

Statistics

Professional career

Spokane Shock
In 2006, Raterink was in training camp with the Spokane Shock of the af2.

Bossier–Shreveport Battle Wings
In 2006, he was traded to the Bossier–Shreveport Battle Wings in Shreveport, Louisiana. He played in all 16 games for the Battlewings and started 15 games at quarterback. He threw for 2,936 yards and 43 touchdowns.

Quad City Steamwheelers
Raterink was assigned to the Quad City Steamwheelers in November 2006. He played for the Steamwheelers for three seasons from 2007 to 2009 and held almost all offensive records for a quarterback. In 2009, Raterink asked for his release from the Steamwheelers. He had been placed on the four-week injury reserve with symptoms of a concussion, but said he felt fine and that he wanted to play.

Fairbanks Grizzlies
After his release from the Steamwheelers, Raterink joined several former Steamwheelers' players and coaches on the Fairbanks Grizzlies of the Indoor Football League. Raterink appeared in two games, completing 11 of 18 passes for 125-yards and 2 touchdowns and no interceptions.

Chicago Rush
Upon the completion of the 2009 season, Raterink considered retiring from professional football. He had begun working for the Quad City Mallards hockey team as well as Enterprise Rent-A-Car, when Mike Hohensee approached Raterink about becoming a backup quarterback for the Chicago Rush in the newly re-organized Arena Football League. Raterink spent the season as Russ Michna's backup, until Michna was lost for the season during a July game with the Dallas Vigilantes. Raterink started the final game for the Rush during the 2010 season, as well as the playoff game where they lost 64–54 to the Milwaukee Iron.

Kansas City Command

Raterink was assigned to the expansion Kansas City Command in 2011, where he was named the starting quarterback. After 13 games Raterink was traded back to Chicago.

Return to the Chicago Rush
Raterink returned to the Rush in 2011 when the Command traded Raterink for Todd Devoe and future considerations.

Iowa Barnstormers
Raterink was assigned to the Iowa Barnstormers in 2012. Raterink was named the starter for the Barnstormers out of training camp. Raterink was off to a great start of the season, when he was injured during a May 19 loss to the Jacksonville Sharks. Raterink sustained an AC contusion in this throwing shoulder, but returned to the lineup the following week playing with extra padding on is shoulder. He went on to set franchise records for passing yards in a single season (4,870) and passing touchdowns (93), passing Kurt Warner and Aaron Garcia respectively. The Barnstormers re-signed Raterink after the season to a two-year deal through the 2014 season.

Los Angeles Kiss
On September 10, 2013, Raterink was traded by the Barnstormers to the Los Angeles Kiss in exchange for Carson Coffman. He was awarded the Al Lucas AFL Pulse Hero Award for his philanthropic efforts during the 2014 season.

Return to the Iowa Barnstormers
On Monday May 12, Raterink was traded by the Los Angeles Kiss to the Jacksonville Sharks and then subsequently traded back to the Iowa Barnstormers.

Return to the KISS
On June 30, 2014, the Barnstormers traded Raterink to the Philadelphia Soul for future considerations. On the same day, the Soul traded Raterink back to the KISS for future considerations.

Las Vegas Outlaws
On October 28, 2014, Raterink and former Los Angeles Kiss teammate Donovan Morgan were announced as the first signings by the Las Vegas Outlaws.

Guangzhou Power
Raterink was selected by the Guangzhou Power of the China Arena Football League (CAFL) in the 12th round of the 2016 CAFL Draft, and was the starting quarterback for the Power during the 2016 season. He completed 82 of 144 passes for 1,152 yards, 20 touchdowns and 7 interceptions. He was listed on the Power's roster for the 2018 season.

Baltimore Brigade
Raterink was assigned to the Baltimore Brigade on August 2, 2017.

AFL statistics

Stats from ArenaFan:

Coaching career
Raterink joined the Northern Colorado football staff in the summer of 2020 to coach defensive backs for UNC.
Raterink most recently was a part of Coach McCaffery's coaching staff at Valor Christian High School from 2018-20 where he helped VCHS win the 2018 5A state championship.

References

External links

1981 births
Living people
American football quarterbacks
Wyoming Cowboys football players
Milwaukee Iron players
Chicago Rush players
Kansas City Command players
Iowa Barnstormers players
Los Angeles Kiss players
Las Vegas Outlaws (arena football) players
Players of American football from Colorado
People from Longmont, Colorado
Quad City Steamwheelers players
Spokane Shock players
Bossier–Shreveport Battle Wings players
Fairbanks Grizzlies players
Jacksonville Sharks players
Philadelphia Soul players
Guangzhou Power players
Baltimore Brigade players
High school football coaches in Colorado